In mathematics,  eta function may refer to:

 The Dirichlet eta function η(s), a Dirichlet series 
 The Dedekind eta function η(τ), a modular form
 The Weierstrass eta function η(w) of a lattice vector
 The eta function  η(s) used to define the eta invariant